This is a list of characters of the 2001 Japanese tokusatsu television series .

Misugi residents

Shouichi Tsugami
Age 21,  is the series protagonist. He suffers amnesia and adopted the addressed name on a letter found in his possession when he washed ashore. He lives with the Misugi family and does all of the household chores. Using the  belt, Shouichi can transform into Kamen Rider Agito, an ancient and powerful warrior whose abilities are constantly evolving with a relic known as the  fitted onto Agito's breastplate. As the series progressed, he discovers the reason behind his amnesia and that his real name is Tetsuya Sawaki. Once the Lords’ terror is over, Shouichi opens a restaurant named after his Rider identity and to honor both survivors and fallen who once inherited the Agito Seeds. He has a Honda VTR1000F, which turns into the  when he transforms.

: Agito's gold-colored basic form which harnesses the power of the earth, turning Shouichi's body into a lethal weapon with his physical strength, speed, and power in perfect balance.
: Agito's blue-colored defensive form that is triggered when Shouichi activates the left switch on the Altering, 'opening' the "Blue Dragon's Eye." In Storm Form, possessing superhuman reflexes and harnessing wind power in his left arm, Agito uses the double-bladed  in either his  finisher or its  variation.
: Agito's red-colored offensive form that is triggered when Shouichi activates the right switch on the Altering, 'opening' the "Red Dragon's Eye."
: A form of Agito that combines the strengths of his Ground, Storm, and Flame Forms, armed with both the Storm Halberd and the Flame Saber that he uses in his  finisher. Shouchi initially assumed this form when he briefly recovered his memories, later regaining access to this form during the events of Kamen Rider Zi-O.
: Agito's penultimate form which uses rage to amplify his power in his  finisher, known as "the power awakening to infinite possibilities." Once Agito masters Burning Form, he molted into his true final form, with his abilities boosted to their peak. Both forms use the double-bladed , which has a naginata-like , primarily wielded in Burning Form, for performing the  finisher, and a sword-like , primarily wielded in Shining Form, for performing the  finisher.

Mana Kazaya
 is the 17-year-old daughter of Nobuyuki Kazaya and niece of Yoshihiko Misugi with whom Shouichi lives. It is revealed that she also possesses the Agito Seed, as Tetsuya Sawaki awakened her powers and eventually asked her help to resurrect Ryō. She was named after mana by her father.

Yoshihiko Misugi
 is a 45-year-old professor of psychology at Jyohoku University. He lives with his son Taichi, Mana, and Shouichi, and once taught Sumiko Ozawa.

Taichi Misugi
 is the 10-year-old son of Yoshihiko Misugi.

Metropolitan Police Department
Tokyo's Metropolitan Police Department previously fought the Unidentified Lifeforms 2 years prior.

Makoto Hikawa
Age 23,  is the hero of the Akatsuki incident. While on routine patrol he saw a bright light in the sea and somehow managed to board the Akatsuki, rescuing everyone on the ship except for one person. Due to these heroics, Makoto Hikawa is chosen to by his superiors to don the G3 System battle suit and become  as part of SAUL.

Makoto took the G3 System on its first run during the Jaguar Lord case, resulting with a feral Agito damaging the suit. Over time, while aiding Agito, Makoto managed to piece together the nature of the Lords' victims, and while investigating the house of Professor Nobuyuki Kazaya he discovered a link between the two cases. Later, after risking his life to stop the fight between Agito and Gills, Makoto gains the upgraded G3-X Suit built to fight the stronger Riders and Unknown. However, the perfection in the suit became its flaw as the AI would momentarily takeover an impure wearer, as seen when the suit acted on Makoto's deepest desires when it took control. After consulting her mentor, Ozawa installs a special inhibitor chip to regress the suit's AI.

Makoto later learns the identity of Agito as Shouichi, though he refuses to accept it at first due to his admiration of Agito. After the two combined their efforts to defeat Skelos Glaucus, Makoto became more respecting of Shouichi. When Hōjō took over the G3 Unit with a reformed method of protecting the Unknown, Makoto was transferred back to Kagaki. However, unable to leave, Makoto and Sumiko took back the G3 Unit, and Makoto donned the G3-X one final time to aid Agito and Gills in defeating the Lords. By the next year, Makoto leaves the G3 Unit and returns to being a normal police officer.

Sumiko Ozawa
 is the 25-year-old Japanese-American genius behind the G3 System. Her position within SAUL's G3 unit is the system's monitor engineer, overseeing the operator and G3 suit during combat from the G-Trailer mobile command base. She was in constant rivalry with Tōru Hōjō. Ozawa was very glad on learning that Shouichi was Agito. In the series epilogue, she left the police force after the Overlord incident and moved to London to work at a university.

During a development of G3-X suit, Ozama use to create a conceptual G4 system. However, she discovered the G4 system's dangerous side-effects on its schematic, and never included it in G3-X's final productions.

Takahiro Omuro
Age 24,  helps Ozawa at the G-Trailer mobile command base. Often the comic relief of the G3 team, he tends to be more immature and carefree than Makoto and Sumiko. In the Kamen Rider Agito special, A New Transformation, he became G3 Mild and gave his battery to Makoto Hikawa (Kamen Rider G3-X), but abandoned being G3 Mild at the conclusion when the project was dropped. In the series epilogue, he becomes squad leader of the G5 Unit.

Tōru Hōjō
 is a 25-year-old fellow cop and Makoto's rival, though he respects Makoto and has admiration for Sumiko. Toru is a brilliant and talented investigator, but is also shown to be crafty and underhanded as in his first attempt to capture Agito which nearly resulted in his being killed by Aki Sakaki. He is also the creator of the Victory One System (V1), which was meant to rival the G3 System. After he gives up on pursuing the G3 system, Hōjō tries to uncover the mysteries behind Kazaya Nobuyuki's murder, thus leading to uncover the culprit: Yukina Sawaki, an Agito. Toru concludes that humans possessing Agito power are more dangerous than Unknown, and convinces his superiors to reform the G3 Unit, but in reality he fears their power much like the Lords and Overlord. When Makoto and Sumiko reclaim the G3 unit from him, he stands down and lets them take it. He is quite surprised to learn that the identity of Kamen Rider Agito is Souichi, Makoto's friend and the same man who mastered the G3-X System. In the series epilogue, Toru meets Makoto at a London university, suggesting that he has fallen in love with her, but rescinds this as a joke and they remain rivals despite hard-won mutual respect.

Recurring characters

Ryō Ashihara
 was a 20-year-old star swimmer of Jyohoku University who recovered from a near-fatal car crash and underwent a metamorphosis, enabling him to transform into the feral , a flawed version of Agito. To learn the truth behind his changes and his father's suicide, Ryō tracks down other survivors of the Akatsuki with his father's black book, eventually meeting Aki Sakaki and developing feelings for her. However, due to a misunderstanding of who killed Aki, Ryō becomes bent on killing Agito.

Attempting to meet an Akatsuki survivor named Masumi, Ryō was attacked by the psychic Katsuhiko Sagara and left for dead. However, Ryō was found by Tetsuya Sawaki, who asked the Overlord to resurrect him again, but the Overlord refused in fear of further shortening his life. Tetsuya then attempted to have the newly awakened Mana Kazaya resurrect him instead. Because of Mana, Ryō discovered that his body chemistry was also altered, able to now accommodate his transformation. Tetsuya later reveals to Ryō the Lords' fear and Ryō's genetic relation to Agito. Furthermore, Ryō learned of Shouichi's identity as Agito and the truth behind Aki's death.

Eventually, Ryō fought Kaoru Kino, outmatched by the man's Agito form and forced to run upon being wounded, suffering from a mysterious chest pain that would kill a normal person. Majima was unable to save Ryō on his own until Tetsuya arrived, allowing him to transfer his Agito Seed into Ryō. As a result, Ryō obtained the ability to become , and used his new power to defeat Kino. This reminded Kino of his intent to save lives, leading to his eventual sacrifice. With the Lords nowhere to be found, Ryō befriended Risa Mishihara, and following her Overlord-induced death he attacked the El of the Ground, only to be defeated and left for dead. However, Gills arrived to aid Agito and G3-X to finish their ultimate fight with the Lords. In the epilogue, Ryō left town and is wandering the world.

Tetsuya Sawaki
 is a 35-year-old man resurrected by the Overlord due to his passive involvement in the death of the first Agito, Yukina Sawaki. He was romantically involved with Yukina and tried to stop her from committing suicide, but ultimately allowed her to plummet to her death; guilt drove him to commit suicide afterwards. As the series progress, Tetsuya is revealed to be the real Shouichi Tsugami, as his current name was his alias borrowed from Yukina's younger brother. The Overlord resurrected him with the power to accelerate the Agito Seed evolution, and Tetsuya turned his back on the Overlord as he realized the world needed more people who can become Agito. Tetsuya eventually managed to redeem himself by saving Kana before the Overlord granted him his rest to view mankind's future alongside him.

Yukina Sawaki
 is a young psychic woman who committed suicide at the age of 23 after discovering she was becoming the very first Agito. She was involved in paranormal research, conducted by Professor Kazaya at Jyohoku University; this resulted in severe trauma and led her to unconsciously kill Kazaya. She left behind a younger brother, Tetsuya Sawaki, who would later become Kamen Rider Agito.

Sakiko Mikumo
 is 32-year-old researcher in charge of the O-Parts Research Department, researching artefacts from long-lost civilizations. By chance, she and her group found the puzzle that held the Overlord's DNA and unlocked it, resulting with the Overlord of Darkness being reborn (and her division being disbanded upon his escape). However, because the Overlord followed her, Mikumo was murdered by Anguis Femineus. As killing a regular human is considered a taboo among the Unknown, Anguis Femineus was forced to commit suicide by the Overlord.

Ryuji Tsukasa
 is a 38-year-old member of the police force who was Hōjō's senior partner, once taking a bullet meant for him. Reviewing the G3 Squad's abilities, he questioned their theories and called them into disgrace as a cover to kill Hisashi Hanamura, the man who murdered his sister for breaking off their wedding. Succeeding to make Hanamura's death look like the work of an Unknown, Tsukasa confessed after Hōjō tore down his alibi.

Kana Okamura
 is a part-time chef, but was unable to cook properly and was fired until Shouichi helped her out. Her father was a chef, a victim of an Unknown attack, thus she herself is an Agito close to awakening. Fearful of this when it occurred, Kana attempted to kill herself, but Shouichi and Tetsuya managed to postpone it and give her a reason to continue living.

Risa Mizuhara
 was a young runner for her high school team, but was hurt and ostracized by her former friends. Taking the identity of the Scorpion, Risa raced recklessly to forget her past. Though Ryō helped her, Risa was killed as the result of the Overlord's genocide of those born under the Scorpio sign.

Nobuyuki Kazaya
 was Mana's father and Yoshihiko Misugi's brother-in-law. He was also Yukina and Tetsuya's college professor. Having died at the age of 45 before the series began, he is depicted in Mana's flashbacks as a loving father, warning her not to tell anyone about her supernatural powers. However, he was actually a very ambitious man, desiring to prove to Yoshihiko Misugi that he could create a superhuman. Obsessed with Yukina's supernatural powers, he conducted a series of experiments on her with Sawaki's aid. This eventually lead to his accidental death at the hands of Yukina.

Akatsuki survivors
The  is a ship where the Overlord of Light's spirit mysteriously appeared and gave the seed of Agito to the passengers aboard. This was opposed by the Overlord of Darkness who sent the El of the Water to attack the Akatsuki. The El fought Tetsuya Sawaki as he awakened as the second Agito, ultimately throwing him in the ocean. While he'd been unable to defeat the El Lord, Agito held him off long enough for policeman Makoto Hikawa to see a storm overcoming the Akatsuki and jump in the water to save possible survivors. He managed to save everyone but Tetsuya, who was declared "lost at sea". From that point on, the lives of the blessed passengers would suffer deep and particular changes as they cross paths throughout the series. Their "leader" is Kaoru Kino.

Kaoru Kino
 is a 32-year-old surgical genius whose career was ruined in a mountain accident which claimed the life of his brother. He was one of the passengers involved in the Akatsuki case. Sometime following the incident, he evolved into a twisted and grotesque version of Agito called , but became disillusioned with his new-found power, until he gets over it thanks to his defeat at the hands of Exceed Gills.

Tomoko Miura
Age 29,  was among the passengers. Tomoko encounters Shouichi by accident, recognizing him as the young man she believed had died on the Akatsuki. Tomoko calls the Misugi residence to tell Shouichi to meet her the next afternoon for the answers he seeks, but prior to their meeting she was strangled to death by the Overlord. The Overlord revealed during conversation with Sawaki that while killing her, he felt the extreme heartache as if killing his own child, leading him to retreat for a period of time to recover.

Saeko Shinohara
Tomoko's 24-year-old friend,  lives with her older brother, an archaeologist. The Akatsuki incident left her traumatized and unable to function until she heard the false legend of Sandouko Lake, and began to scuba-dive for relics of an ancient civilization which worshipped an Agito. To keep Saeko in that state of mind, her brother dumped the relics she found into the lake. When Saeko's special ability began to surface, Equus Dies attacks her, and during the subsequent fight between Gills and Dies, Saeko's leg becomes tangled in seaweed and she drowns.

Aki Sakaki
Age 24, claiming to be a housekeeper sent by Professor Misugi,  was sent by fellow Akatsuki survivors to investigate Shouichi, claiming to be his high-school sweetheart when pressed. She also encounters Ryō, for whom she develops feelings and begins to reveal the truth about the Akatsuki. However, they were interrupted when Ryō was attacked by Hōjō and his group. Believing Ryō to be dead, Aki's powers begin to manifest and her evolution is accelerated by an encounter with Tetsuya, which corrupts her.  Aki used her psychic powers to murder those involved in the Agito Capture Plan while evading the Jaguar Lords. While attempting to kill Hōjō, Aki learns that Ryō was still alive. With the aid of Gills, she escapes an attack by Pantheras Rubeo but is ambushed by Pantheras Magistra who snaps her neck. Ryō finds Agito over her dead body and assumes Agito murdered her, leading to a series of heated battles between them.

Katsuhiko Sagara
Age 25,  was awaken by Tetsuya and gained psychokinetic and regenerative powers. He managed to kill Gills and attempted to trick Mana into believing she could not control her powers. Katsuhiko was murdered by Crustata Palleo.

Masumi Sekiya
 is a 21-year-old cynical woman and one of the passengers from the Akatsuki incident, who served as a host to the El of the Water until he gathered enough energy to leave her body, fatally depleting her life-energy as a result.

Kōji Majima
Age 16,  came from a line of doctors, befriended Mana and idolized Kaoru Kino. When Ryō was injured after a fight with Another Agito, Kōji was told by Tetsuya to give Ryō his Agito Seed in order to save his life. As Kōji gave up his power, Ryō was not only completely healed, but was able to access Exceed Gills. Kōji is the only surviving passenger from the Akatsuki at the end of the series.

Jun Tachibana
 is Masumi Sekiya's 21-year-old friend, murdered by her when she was under the El's influence.

Masahide Takashima
 was the Akatsukis captain. He was murdered by Masumi Sekiya under the El's influence.

Kazuo Ashihara
 is Ryō's father. After the incident, although he was missing, he died of a mental breakdown at the station.

Unknown
The major antagonists of Kamen Rider Agito,  is a police designation for a race of powerful monsters that have been causing deaths around Tokyo, targeting carriers of the Agito seed.

Overlord
The  is the highest power among the Unknown, and is referred to as the creator of the human race. Long ago, there existed twin entities; one being the embodiment of light while the other was embodiment of darkness. These "brothers" co-existed in harmony for a time, creating the world before battling for control over it. Defeated, the Overlord of Light used his dying breath to bestow his essence – the power of Agito – upon humanity, with the hopes that they would evolve beyond him. The Overlord of Darkness took it upon himself to personally eliminate the vessels of Agito, creating the Lords to kill all humans who possess the potential to evolve into Agito.

Though he died around the Pleistocene, the Overlord of Darkness left a puzzle that, once solved, reconstructed his body from a DNA model, and he escaped from a containment box in the O-Parts laboratory as an infant.  Maturing into an eight-year-old boy, he followed Sakiko Mikumo, who had witnessed his birth, and punished Anguis Femineus for killing her. The Overlord used his power to heal a mortally-injured Ryō, assuming adult form as a result. After nearly being killed by a fear-driven Gills, the Overlord killed Tomoko Miura, and was arrested and placed in a psychiatric ward after he shut down from the psychological burden of the murder.  The Overlord then watched from the sidelines as the Lords committed various supernatural murders on anyone reaching paranormal maturity, though he intervened once to give Agito's Tornador a power-boost.  This would later result in Shouichi, along with Ryō and Makoto Hikawa, further complicating matters and interfering in the work of his emissaries.

Casualties mounted on both sides, with the death of the El of the Water convincing the Overlord that the vessels of Agito – Shouichi Tsugami, Ryō Ashihara, and Kaoru Kino – had grown too powerful. He recommitted to seeing all active Agito vessels hunted down and stripped of their Seeds of Agito, and killing the Riders to suppress the Seeds already absorbed. However, with Makoto's aid, Shouichi dealt a decisive blow to the Overlord that released the Seeds of Agito back to their rightful owners and forced the Overlord to retreat. The shock that even normal humans had grown strong enough to oppose his power convinced the Overlord that humanity was no longer worthy of existence, and so began orchestrating their extermination.

The Overlord enacted his genocide of humanity, realigning the constellations of the Zodiac, to kill all of mankind in bizarre doppelgänger homicides starting with those born under Scorpio. The required concentration rendered the Overlord vulnerable, so he created the El of the Wind as his bodyguard and the El of the Ground to continue killing those reaching paranormal maturity. The Riders fought back, destroyed the El Lords, and wounded the retreating Overlord. The Overlord then had a conversation with Tetsuya Sawaki which convinced him that he did not truly understand the mankind he created.  The Overlord implies that he will postpone his plans, and observe how humans use their own gifts and whether or not they are worthy of existence.

Lords
The  are a group of powerful disciples serving under the Overlord, who created them from his body to protect humanity.

All Lords are human-like with the head of the animal whose tribe they belong to, and wing-shaped protuberances extending from their shoulders. The Lords target survivors of the Akatsuki incident and humans who possess psychic power, as these people have the potential to become Agito. The Lords' motivation is to protect humanity, believing they do not require the power of Agito which would only corrupt them. When they murder an awakened or potential Agito, they perform a ritual with their hands, saying that they want permission to sin; at the same time, a halo would appear over their heads. Every tribe had a unique way of killing, for example: leaving the corpse in a tree, dissolving the human, drying the human to death, changing the human into sand, pulling the human into the ground, dragging the human into the air and dropping them, vaporizing, etc. Killing a normal human is considered a taboo with a penalty of death, though there are exceptions if the human in question committed murder. When a Lord is killed, the halo typically materializes over their heads before they explode.

El Lords
They normally reside with their master's body until summoned, possessing the ability of speech.
This Lord is responsible for the Akatsuki Incident, attacking Sawaki when he awakened as the second Agito. The El of the Water allowed the others aboard to live until they begin the evolution to Agito, entering the body of Masumi Sekiya to ensure they would not tell anyone what had occurred. He eventually awakened, using Masumi to kill for him until he found the Overlord and gained the power to leave his host, killing her in the process. Using Orcinus to stall Agito, the El arrived to personally kill Shouichi. However Ryō intervened and got Shouichi out of harm's way. The El of the Water later encountered G3-X, yet spared him after sensing Makoto had no potential of becoming an Agito. The El Lord was eventually defeated by Agito Burning Form, returning to the Overlord's body to recuperate and undergo an evolution. He managed to overpower the Riders, taking out Agito while fighting the others and winning. But once Shouichi awakened with his memories restored, he battles the El in Burning Form. Soon enough, the tables turned and the El was wounded by Exceed Gills, Another Agito, and Agito Shining Form. The El of the Water was unable to return to the Overlord's body in time and was reduced to a puddle of water, to his creator's shock.
 : A hawk-themed Lord and the strongest of the air-based Lords, created by the Overlord to ensure no one intervene while he is channeling his power. The El of the Wind fought Gills after killing a witness to the Overlord's trance, and could overpower Exceed Gills and Agito Burning Form with little trouble. He later aided the El of the Ground in defeating Agito Shining Form but before the two Lords could kill him, G3-X and Exceed Gills arrived, defeating the El of the Wind.
 : A lion-themed Lord and the strongest of the land-based Lords, he was created by the Overlord to continue the Lords' task to slaughter those with the potential to become Agito. He was able to turn people into dust with his sand and burrow underground. This El holds considerable strength as apparent from his first encounter with Gills, who engaged him in battle for the death of Risa. He was able to outmatch Agito Ground and Burning Forms, but Agito Shining Form mortally wounded him. The El was then renergized and strengthened by the Overlord, and aided by the El of Wind to defeat Agito. However, Gills and G3-X soon arrived; while they battled the El of the Wind, Agito Shining Form destroyed the El of the Ground.

Jaguar Lords
The  are Unknowns based on big cats of the genus Panthera. They killed their victims with a snap of the neck before leaving the corpse on a tree.
 : A leopard Unknown and the first of the Unknowns, wearing a red scarf around his neck. He targeted the Saeki family, killing them one by one. Makoto Hikawa encountered the Lord after he killed the wife, and was spared as he was not Luteus's target. Makoto took pursuit in G3 gear but was overpowered by Luteus until Agito arrived and destroyed the Lord.
He witnesses Luteus' death by Agito. He and Tristis sabotage the counter before Albus murders a young woman, Minako Tsujiguchi, then targets her twin sister and mother. Hōjō uses the sister to flush out the killer, meeting Albus who was going to kill Hōjō for his interference. A fight breaks out joined by G3, Tristis, and Agito, in which Albus was destroyed by Agito Ground Form. Voiced by Jin Yamanoi.
Tristis witnesses Luteus' death by Agito, and he and Albus sabotage the counter. In a subsequent fight involving Tristis, Albus, G3 and Agito, Tristis is destroyed by Agito Storm Form. Voiced by Jin Yamanoi.
He goes after Aki, only to be telekinetically strangled as she escapes him while Shouichi arrives and battles him as Agito Flame Form.
 : A red subordinate of Pantheras Magistra armed with two Avariceful Swords. He attacks Aki while she goes after Hōjō, only to be telekinetically impaled with his sword before she runs off. He later finds her, but is halted by Gills who kills him. Voiced by Shigenori Sōya.
Though she command her two minions to kill Aki, she finishes the job herself and snaps the girl's neck as Shouichi arrives. After a heated battle, Agito kills Magistra.

Tortoise Lords
The  are able to swim through the ground like fish in water; their method of killing is to pull the victim into the ground, burying them alive with no sign of soil disturbance.
 : A sea turtle Unknown wearing silver armor and a turquoise scarf, Oceanus was responsible for indirectly revealing to Makoto the nature of the Lords' victims. He made his move again at Yamato Park, with Shouichi sensing the Lord. Oceanus has the upper hand but Agito is eventually able to crack the monster's armored body and kill it.
 : A gopher tortoise Unknown wearing golden armor and a green scarf, Terrestris comes to aid Oceanus during his fight with Agito. He later resurfaces to kill an entire family in Ōme City. He is halted by a police officer and then by G3 before Agito arrives. He was destroyed when G3 uses his GG-02 Salamander on him, with a delayed reaction to the attack.

Snake Lords
The  are able to move at blurring speeds for short distances, like wind gusts.  Their method of killing is to teleport the victim several feet into the air and drop them.
He later targeted Mayumi Katahira, with Makoto delaying him until Agito arrived. Masculus was overpowered by Agito's Ground and Storm Forms until Femineus arrived to cover their escape. Masculus later tried to kill Mayumi again, accidentally completing Ryō's change. When Masculus attempted to kill Mayumi a third time, he evoked the wrath of Ryō who assumed the form of Gills. Masculus is initially able to overpower Gills, but Gills matures to full power and pummels Masculus into submission before brutally killing him.
She arrives to aid Masculus on the Overlord's approval, overpowering Agito and covering their escape. Femineus later battles Agito and G3, and is forced to retreat after being disarmed by Agito Storm Form. Later, after being denied the Overlord's aid in healing her, a rage-filled Femineus murdered Sakiko Mikumo, with the Overlord telekinetically forcing Femineus to kill herself for breaking the taboo of taking the life of a normal human. She returned in the Hyper Battle special, Kamen Rider Agito: Three Great Riders, only to be destroyed by Agito Flame Form.

Crow Lords
The  can fly as fast as jets; they use aerial-themed killing methods from fatal divebomb charges to lifting a human into the air and dropping him.
 : After killing four people, Croccio encountered and overpowered Agito Ground Form, leaving him for dead. The G3 and police fail to keep Croccio from his sixth victim. Agito challenges the Lord again and Croccio lures him into a trap which Agito manages to reverse, killing it.
Luscus later aided Intonsus in fighting Agito Flame Form, evoking Agito Trinity Form. Though he escaped in their first fight, Luscus reappeared to kill Sagara after he killed Ryō, but was intercepted by Agito and killed.
She attempted to kill Sagara before he was fully awakened but was forced to battle Agito Flame Form; despite Luscus coming to her aid, she was the first to be destroyed by Agito Trinity Form's Fire Storm Attack.
He chased after Sagara, but was unable to kill him due to Sagara's awakened powers. He aided Luscus, only to be killed by Agito Trinity Form. Voiced by Yoshimasa Chida.
 : She attacked a woman who would have died if not taken to the hospital by Ryō and Kino. Canosus later attacked another girl, but was halted by Gills. Agito arrives to help, weakening the Lord for Gills to deliver the deathblow. Voiced by Touko Fujita.

Zebra Lords
The  use a form of rapid decay as their killing mechanism, using it on normal humans who interfere. Voiced by Hiroyuki Shibamoto.
 : A black-skinned Unknown with red mane and cape, his killing attracts the attention of the police. Noctis attacks a woman baring the unborn child of his previous victim; Makoto manages to save her by luring the Unknown away while fighting for his own life. Toru arrives in the G3 and occupies the Lord until Agito appears; Noctis is able to escape with help from Equus Dies, but when he makes another attempt on the woman's life, Agito intervenes and kills Noctis.
 : A white-skinned Unknown with blue mane and cape, he arrives to aid Noctis in fighting and escaping Agito. Later, Equus Dies attacks Saeko Shinohara but is destroyed by Gills.

Jackal Lords
The  are able to move at fast speeds, and kill people by servering an artery at the neck, giving the illusion of a kamaitachi.
Evading Gills on a second attempt, Falx crosses paths with Agito who uses the Lord's speed to defeat him. Falx reappears in the Hyper Battle special, Kamen Rider Agito: Three Great Riders, where he is destroyed by G3-X. Voiced by Yoshimasa Chida.
He was attacking the police for interfering in his hunt when G3-X intervened, reinforced by Agito. Though Glaucus escaped, Agito and G3-X pursued and used teamwork to defeat the Lord. Voiced by Hiroyuki Shibamoto.

Bee Lords
The  kill people through a form of matter transference, burying the victim alive in a honeycomb wall.
He was destroyed by Agito Storm Form. Voiced by Katsumi Shiono.
 : A honey bee Unknown armed with a rapier named the Purgatorial Needle. She fought Agito in both Storm and Flame Forms before retreating, losing one of her antenna in the process. So wounded, Mellitus attacked random people without discrimination, momentarily driven away by Hōjō in the V1 suit.

Stingray Lords
The  kill by having a person fall to death via matter transference. Voiced by Katsumi Shiono.
Cucullus was intercepted and killed by Shouichi in the G3-X suit.
 : A manta ray Unknown with blue skin and hook-like tendrils used as weapons. After witnessing the death of Cucullus, Cassis attacked his victim but was intercepted by Agito. Cassis defeated Agito, but was pursued by Makoto in the modified G3-X suit and blasted to bits.

Fish Lords
The  have a killing method that resembles diver's sickness. 
 : Carries a trident named . His first victim was the Mirage Bar's owner, Minoru Sano, also known as Isamu Takagi of the Phantom Thief brothers. As a result, Arapaima was also after Isamu's younger brother and partner, Akira Takagi, who was three days away from taking advantage of the statute of limitations on a seven-year-old heist. When Akira was arrested, Arapaima attacked, forced to fight Agito and G3-X, which worked in tandem to kill Arapaima. Voiced by Katsumi Shiono.
 : This piranha Unknown attempts to kill Majima, but was stopped by Gills. Serratus was able to overpower Gills, but fell to Another Agito. Voiced by Hiroyuki Shibamoto.

Lizard Lords
The  kill by using an acid mist to suffocate the victim, with the body then dissolving into foam.
 : Wearing a red scarf, he fell into an ambush by Hōjō as part of his plan to capture Agito. Dextera was halted by police fire until Agito arrived, fighting him until Sinistra came to his aid. However, Dextera was destroyed by Agito Shining Form.
Sinistra arrived to aid Dextera in fighting Agito, retreating after Dextera was destroyed. Sinistra was later destroyed by G3-X.

Ant Lords
The  are exclusive to the movie, Kamen Rider Agito the Movie: Project G4.  Their method of killing is to spray a suffocation-induced liquid in their victim's face. The Ant Lords are a rarity, able to override the Lords' taboo and kill normal humans.
 : Army ant drones used by the stronger Ant Lords, a pack of them appeared to kill the children at a psychic school. The staff had been killed by the time G3-X arrived and battled one of the drones, killing it. The Pedes resurface two months later, attacking those who passed the  Quiz. One was one killed by Gills when it attacked Rei Motoki. Agito and G3-X were forced to fight the Pedes until G4 arrived and destroyed them with his Gigant. The entire Pedes army soon found their way to the GA base upon sensing Mana's power, with numbers of them killed by Agito, Gills, G3-X, and G4. The surviving members were last seen mauling Risa Fukami. Voiced by Rider Chips, and Katsumi Shiono.
 : The commander of Pedes, armed with a scythe, he led the Pedes in fighting Agito and G3-X until G4 arrived. He later reappears at GA Base, aiding Regia in fighting Agito Burning Form. But Gills, despite losing his arm in the fight, regenerates and transforms into Exceed Gills to attack and kill Eques. Voiced by Hiroyuki Shibamoto.
She leads the drones and soldiers into the base, over-powering Gills by ripping his arm off as he collapses from shock. She battled Agito, only to be killed by his Shining Form.

Other Lords
 : An , he emerges from a watery portal with his method of killing being to artificially drown people. After killing his first victim, Octipes is intercepted by Hōjō in the G3 suit, who almost killed the victim's son. He was reduced to sludge by the G3's weaponry. However, the remnants of Octipes entered a small body of water and reformed into a new Octipes with immunities to G3's arsenal. When Hōjō arrives to intercept him, Octipes easily overpowers him, forcing Hōjō to discard the G3 suit and flee. By then, Agito joins the fight and kills Octipes. Voiced by Yoshimasa Chida.
 : A , he kills using a ponytail-like stinger to inflict a liquid metallic poison on the victim's neck, which kills with a fatal freeze burn within 24 hours. When Acutia targets Mana, Agito covers her escape but Acutia succeeds in poisoning Shouichi. When Acutia attempts to finish the job the following day, Agito breaks through Acutia's defense, killing him and neutralizing the poison. Voiced by Shigenori Sōya.
 : A  who conjures lightning bolts so his victims die from spontaneous human combustion. His targets were originally humans with latent psychic abilities.  During Ignio's fight with Agito and G3, when Ryuji Tsukasa arrives, the Overlord has Ignio say that "Humans shall not kill other humans" while hinting at Tsukasa's actions. Resuming his attack the following day, Ignio is destroyed by Agito Storm Form. He reappears in the Hyper Battle Special, Kamen Rider Agito: Three Great Riders, and is destroyed by Gills. Voiced by Masaharu Satō.
 : A , his method of killing is using saliva on people, making it appear that they had died of starvation. Famelicare killed a man while he was driving with his wife, the crash killing her in the process. He then targeted their only son Kazuki Asano, though Agito intervened and fought him off. When Famelicare attempted again to kill the boy, Ryō battled the Lord as Gills, killing Famelicare. Voiced by Jin Yamanoi.
Palleo first appeared to kill Sagara, only to be knocked out by his psychic power. Palleo later attempted to get revenge during a fireworks rally while Sagara was using his power to force Mana to distance herself from humans, only to be halted by Agito. Palleo managed to defeat Agito and G3-X, and almost succeeded in killing Masumi, only to be halted by Orcinus. Palleo later managed to mortally injure Sagara, but was halted and ultimately killed by Agito's Storm Form.
He first appeared to halt Palleo from harming Masumi, as he was a follower of the El of the Water. Once partially awakened, the El orders him to kill Majima and Mana. Orcinus is intercepted by Agito, who he overpowers, but is halted by a revived Gills, and is forced to fight Gills and G3-X until managing to retreat. Orcinus then attempted to kill Shouichi, forcing him to fight the Lord as Agito with Ryō present. The fight ended with Agito Ground Form destroying the Lord.
 : A , he uses the paired  as his weapons. Cruentus attempted to kill Majima, but Gills intervened and battled the Lord until the El of the Water arrived to exterminate Gills. Cruentus later attempts to kill Majima, only for G3-X to intervene. Cruentus soon goes to attack Gills directly, with G3-X interfering until the El of the Water evened the odds. However, Shouichi arrived with a renewed sense of courage, assuming Burning Form as a result; using his newfound powers, Agito obliterated Cruentus. Voiced by Toshihide Tsuchiya.
He kills by shooting a needle from his horn into the victim's neck, turning them to ash. His first victim was Susumu Murano, also targeting the younger brother and the bodyguard assigned to him. Fortis was intercepted by G3-X and overpowered both G3-X and Agito before retreating. He later resurfaces and battles Agito Burning Form before again retreating. When the Lord resurfaces, he defeats G3-Mild and overpowers G3-X until Omuro regains consciousness and fully reenergizes the G3-X. Gills and Agito join the fight, but the three Riders were no match for the Lord until Agito assumed Shining Form for the first time, killing the Lord. Voiced by Shigenori Sōya.
 : An  who kills by cracking the skulls of his victims. He briefly fought Another Agito until the Overlord arrived and forced him to retreat. The Overlord later sent Ulucus after Another Agito, holding him at bay until his master arrived. He was destroyed by Agito Ground Form.
 : A  who kills by cracking the skulls of his victims. Created by the Overlord to aid Ulucus in fighting Gills. The Lord was later sent after Agito to hold him at bay until his master arrived. Falco later attempted to kill the powerless Riders on his master's order. With Hōjō's aid, G3-X killed Falco. However, Falco managed to deliver a fatal headbutt to Kino's stomach. Voiced by Toshihide Tsuchiya.
He was about to kill Mana when Ryō intervened. Though his quill hit Shouichi by mistake, it was removed before the wound killed Shouichi. Liquor aided Falco in pursuing Mana and Ryō, and overpowered G3-X until Shouichi arrived, eventually regaining the Agito power. Liquor fell to a combo attack from Gills.

Spin-off exclusive characters

Azuma Kunieda
 is a 40-year-old psychologist and friend of Yoshihiko Misugi who nursed Shouichi back to health after he washed ashore. Sometime after, Kuneida would place him in the care of Yoshihiko Misugi.

Japan Ground Self-Defense Force GA Division
The Japan Ground Self-Defense Force (JGSDF) is the de facto army of Japan.  Featured in Kamen Rider Agito the Movie: Project G4, the GA division is responsible for the militarization of battle suits.

Shiro Mizuki
 is a 35-year-old second lieutenant and one of the military officers guarding the GA psychic educational facility when the Formica Pedes Lords attacked. Though he would survive the ordeal, he would be left a jaded man, his pride scarred, living as one who would embrace death as the means of becoming stronger, turning him into a suicide-seeking soldier. He volunteered as operator for the G4 suit and eventually clashed with G3-X operator Makoto, to put their ideals to the test on the battlefield. Despite his suit being an upgraded version of Makoto's, the more-experienced Rider was able to defeat him in battle by removing his helmet. Due to a dangerous side-effect of G4 system, its suit will cause malfunction and killing its operator, turning their corpse into its host body. As Mizuki died by the suit's malfunction, the G4 suit used his corpse and attempted to rise again to continue the fight, forcing Makoto to destroy it.

G4 could also be further enhanced by use of an esper linked to a system which would predict the flow of combat, enabling G4 to respond to its opponent's attacks before they began to execute them.

Risa Fukami
From the JGSDF GA division, assigned to the G3 Unit, a 25-year-old captain, stealing the data from Ozawa's computer relating to the G4, a conceptual schematic which was never included in a final production of G3-X suit. She then quit the G3 Unit and created the G4 suit, intending to perfect it for mass-production for two months. Four suicide-seeking candidates, such as Mizuki volunteers her G4 project, with the latter is the suit's last operator. She conducts shady operations to improve the G4 suit, such as kidnapping those who has an esper ability and use their powers to empower the suit's operator. She was mauled to death by the Ant Lords while her creation was destroyed.

Sayaka Kahara
 is a 12-year-old girl with the psychic ability of clairvoyance. She came from a wealthy family and lived relatively well until she was orphaned during a car crash which killed the rest of her family. She entered into the research study at the GA psychic educational facility as a candidate psychic for the G4 project.

Rei Motoki
 is a 10-year-old boy gifted with psychic ability. He, like most children in the GA Psychic Facility, was orphaned at a young age.

References

Characters
Agito
Kamen Rider Agito